Legion is a 1998 action horror television film directed by Jon Hess (aka John Daniel Hess and Jon Daniel Hess)  with screenplay by Patrick Highsmith and Evan Spiliotopoulos. It was  produced by Avi Nesher for Mahagonny Pictures and Conquistador Entertainment Inc. and aired first on April 18, 1998.

The film stars Terry Farrell  (best known for her performances in the television series Star Trek: Deep Space Nine and Becker), Corey Feldman, Rick Springfield and Trevor Goddard.

Nesher is also known for  his screenplay Doppelganger (1993) and as director of the HBO films Savage  and Mercenary (both 1996).

Plot
The story is set in the year 2036  and revolves around a special forces team led by Major Agatha Doyle (Farrell) formed from death-row prisoners and their ensuing mission.

Captain Aldrich is a former war hero convicted and on death row who is offered the chance at a pardon if he will join the team and undertake their mission to infiltrate an enemy facility. Once they have gained access to the base they are confused by the apparent lack of resistance and upon further inspection they find their enemies bodies piled up in a storeroom. Their state of mind is weakened when they are attacked and some of them are killed without seeing the perpetrator. After finding a computer disk holding information they listen to the account given by the enemy team commander about how events unfolded leading to their enemies demise. Finally it dawns on them that the unknown killer that picked their enemies off one by one is now stalking them. The surviving members of Doyle's team have to try to destroy the demon enemy before it destroys them.

Cast
Parker Stevenson as Captain  Aldrich
Terry Farrell  as Major Agatha Doyle
Corey Feldman as Siegal
Rick Springfield  as Corporal Ryan
Troy Donahue as General Flemming
Audie England  as Doctor Jones
Trevor Goddard as Cutter

References

External links

1998 films
1998 television films
American action horror films
American horror television films
1990s action horror films
1998 action films
1998 horror films
Action television films
Films set in 2036
Films about veterans
Films set in the future
The Kushner-Locke Company films
1990s English-language films
1990s American films